al-Tall District is a district of the Rif Dimashq Governorate in southern Syria. The administrative centre is the city of al-Tall. At the 2004 census, the district had a population of 115,937.

Sub-districts
The district of al-Tall is divided into three sub-districts or nawāḥī (population as of 2004):

Localities in al-Tall District
According to the Central Bureau of Statistics (CBS), the following villages, towns and cities make up the district of al-Tall:

References

 
Districts of Rif Dimashq Governorate